Finn Park is a football stadium in Ballybofey, Ireland. The home ground of League of Ireland team Finn Harps, it has a 'safe capacity' of 4,200 with 351 seats.

Facilities
The ground is in a relatively dilapidated condition, although upgraded to modern safety standards. Only three sides are officially open, the covered "Shed" with mixed seating/terracing on the Navenny Road side with a capacity of 1,505, the large "Town End" terrace on the Chestnut Road side with capacity 1,748, and the "Gantry" viewing slope capacity 1,195, which is rarely used by home fans and houses the television/radio gantry. The "River End" embankment is officially closed and is generally used for ambulance parking. Fan segregation is rarely officially in existence and effectively unenforced.

Finn Park hosted the amateur Republic of Ireland national football team against Yugoslavia in a qualifier for the 1972 Summer Olympics in April 1971.

In 2020, with Covid-19 restrictions effectively restricting the use of the usual dressing room and clubhouse layout, Finn Harps embarked upon a project to upgrade the dressing room facilities in Finn Park with the installation of a new home dressing room, medical area, shower room, kit room and wash room, and a kitchen on the Gantry Side of the ground. The previous home team dressing room has become the away dressing room area with two teams entering the pitch from different gates as a result.

Upgrade
Finn Harps have plans at an advanced stage to move to a new 6,800 seater stadium across the River Finn in Stranorlar, within sight of their current home. Construction began in October 2008. This will lead to the demolition of Finn Park once the new Finn Harps Stadium is completed.

Construction work began in October 2008 with the official 'turning of the sod' by then Minister for the State Pat 'The Cope' Gallagher. 
Land filling and top soil work began in late 2011 with concrete foundations going in early 2012. 
Steel structures are due to be put in place over June/July 2012 with building work to begin soon after.
The club originally hoped to be in the new 6,800 all seater stadium by summer 2013, but with recession hitting the building industry hard in Ireland, work stalled on the ground in November 2014. 

A fresh plan was drawn for the ground, in an attempt to help the club move forward in August 2019, with work hoped to start again in summer 2020, but a mix of issue with the government sports departments, and Covid-19, work had again stalled on the project.

References

Finn Harps F.C.
Association football venues in the Republic of Ireland
Association football venues in County Donegal